Holy Hour is the Roman Catholic devotional tradition of spending an hour in Eucharistic adoration in the presence of the Blessed Sacrament. A plenary indulgence is granted for this practice. The practice is also observed in some Lutheran churches and some Anglican churches.

History

In the Gospel of Matthew, during the agony in the Garden of Gethsemane the night before his crucifixion, Jesus spoke to his disciples, saying "My soul is sorrowful even to death. Remain here and keep watch with me." (Matthew 26:38) Returning to the disciples after prayer, he found them asleep and in Matthew 26:40 he asked Peter:"So, could you men not keep watch with me for an hour?". He did not ask for an hour of activity, but for an hour of companionship.

In 1673 Saint Margaret Mary Alacoque stated that she had a vision of Jesus in which she was instructed to spend an hour every Thursday night to meditate on the sufferings of Jesus in the Garden of Gethsemane. This practice later became widespread among Roman Catholics.

In 1829, the Archconfraternity of the Holy Hour was established by Père Robert Debrosse at Paray-le-Monial, Burgundy, France. In 1911 it received the right of aggregation for the entire world. A similar society called "The Holy Perpetual Hour of Gethsemani" was formed in Toulouse in 1885 and was canonically erected in 1907. In 1909 it received indulgences from Pope Pius X.

Maundy Thursday 
On Maundy Thursday (also known as Holy Thursday), the liturgy of the Roman Catholic Church provides for the transfer of the Blessed Sacrament in a procession to a side altar or a sacrament chapel after the Mass of the Lord's Supper. This holy hour, during which the faithful remain in silent worship for "a suitable time", is to last at least until midnight, but be without any solemnity after the dawn of Good Friday. 

The holy hour on Maundy Thursday commemorates the prayer and vigil of Jesus on the Mount of Olives, when he asked his Father to spare him his suffering in view of his approaching death, as well as the admonition to his disciples "Watch, and pray, that ye enter not into temptation" (Mt 26).

Slang meaning

In the Irish Free State and Republic of Ireland, the "holy hour" was the term applied to the closing of public houses between 2.30 and 3.30 p.m. on Monday to Saturday in the cities of Dublin and Cork. It was introduced by Minister for Justice Kevin O'Higgins in the 1920s to curb afternoon drinking by workers. It was removed in 1988. On Sundays, pubs in Cork and Dublin had to close between 2 and 4 p.m.; this restriction was not removed until 2000. Pubs often merely locked the doors, allowing those in the pubs to continue drinking during the holy hour.

See also
 Dominicae cenae, apostolic letter of John Paul II on "The Mystery and Worship of the Eucharist"

References

Catholic devotions
Eucharistic devotions